Seventh Day Slumber is an American Christian rock band from Dallas, Texas, formed in 1996.  They were an independent band for five years until they signed with BEC Records in 2005. They are best known for their song "Oceans from the Rain" which was the 14th most played song on Christian CHR radio in 2006 according to the Weekend 22. Their songs have been featured frequently on X the album series.

History 

Joseph Rojas tried to commit suicide following a cocaine binge, and became a Christian while being taken to the hospital in an ambulance. Joseph Rojas and Bernie Dufrene formed Seventh Day Slumber in the summer of 1996 at Christ for the Nations Institute in Dallas, Texas, where they met, wrote, and raised money for their first four-song demo project. The band was later signed to BEC Recordings. He teamed with guitarist Evan Weatherford, bassist Joshua Schwartz and drummer Adam Witte. After signing to the Afinia label the group issued Matthew Twenty-Five three years later. Their second album Freedom From Human Regulations was also released on an independent album before they made their major-label debut with Picking Up the Pieces in 2003.

Seventh Day Slumber released Once Upon a Shattered Life in 2005 which spanned their hit singles "Caroline" and "Oceans from the Rain". The album hit No. 1 on the Billboard Heatseekers Albums chart and No. 26 on the Top Christian Albums chart. After re-releasing Picking Up the Pieces that same year, they released Finally Awake in 2007. It peaked at No. 16 on Billboards Top Christian Albums chart. The Spanish-language album Rescátame contained re-recordings of previous songs and it won the 2009 Dove Award for Spanish Language Album of the Year at the 40th GMA Dove Awards. It was followed by Take Everything, an album of new arrangements of Christian music worship songs. The album peaked at No. 141 on the Billboard 200 and No. 11 on the Top Christian Albums charts. The Anthem of Angels was released in November 2011. The "Small Town America Tour" ran from August 2011 to February 2012 to promote the album.

On March 8, 2013, the band issued Love and Worship, their second worship album featuring covers of contemporary Christian songs and originals.Afterwards, on May 13, 2014, they released We Are the Broken, then toured in the fall of that year with DavsEye and Nine Lashes.

On 9 October, SDS released an EP, Redline, which featured a cover of Temple of the Dog's "Hunger Strike" with Disciple vocalist Kevin Young guesting; they then co-headlined with Fireflight for the Small Town America Tour with guests Shonlock and Scarlet White.On July 28, 2017, Found, the tenth studio album by the band, was released.

After a period of touring, Joseph Rojas announced in a broadcast in October 30th, 2018 the release of Closer to Chaos in May 31st, 2019, and its guesting songwriters, including Josiah Prince of Disciple and Kellen McGregor of Memphis May Fire. In August 7th, 2020, SDS dropped a worship EP, Unseen - The Lion, which was followed by a companion, Unseen - The Lamb, on September 24, 2020, and both were combined into a single album on January 15, 2021, with two bonus tracks. Successively on June 1, the first single for their thirteenth recording, Death by Admiration, "What I've Become" was dropped; the album was released in January 28th, 2022. A music video for the title track, which featured Tyler Smith of The Word Alive as guest vocalist and co-songwriter, was released in March 4th, 2022.

Activities
Joseph Rojas began hosting a national-syndicated radio program in 2015. In April 2018, Rojas formed a new record group called Nashville Label Group. Seventh Day Slumber signed with the group's RockFest Records.

Etymology and Influences
The band's name Seventh Day Slumber comes from Genesis 2:2 where on the seventh day, after creating the universe, God rested. The band's influences include Collective Soul, Live, Jars of Clay, Pearl Jam, Second Coming and Creed.

Members

 Joseph Rojas – vocals, guitar
 Blaise Rojas – drums
 Ken Reed – bass guitar
 Weston Evans - guitar

Former members
Jeremy Holderfield – guitar
Talia Haughn-Comer – bass guitar
Joshua Schwartz – bass guitar
Ray Fryoux – drums
Elliot Lopes – drums
Rusty Clutts – drums
Adam Witte – drums
Tim Parady – keyboards, vocals
Evan Weatherford – guitar
Michael Johns – guitar
Juan Alvarez – drums
Phillip King – keyboards, vocals
Jamie Davis – drums
Matt Norwood – drums
Anthony Garcia – bass guitar
Isaac Rodriguez – guitar, keyboards
Ruben Trevino – drums
Bernie Dufrene - drums

Discography 
Studio albums
Matthew Twenty Five (1999)
Freedom From Human Regulations (2001)
Picking Up the Pieces (2003) (rerelease 2005)
Once Upon a Shattered Life (2005)
Finally Awake (2007)
 Take Everything (2009)
 The Anthem of Angels (2011)
 Love and Worship (2013)
 We Are the Broken (2014)
 Found (2017)
 Closer to Chaos (2019)
 Unseen: The Lion and the Lamb (2021)
 Death by Admiration (2022)

EPs
 Redline EP (2015)
 Unseen: The Lion (EP) (2020)
 Unseen: The Lamb (EP) (2020)

Compilations
Rescátame  (May 27, 2008)
 A Decade of Hope (March 29, 2011) (contains full albums Picking Up the Pieces, Once Upon a Shattered Life, and Finally Awake)

Billboard charting albums (North America)

Singles

Music Videos

References

External links

 Cross Rhythms Magazine, Issue 78 - From Cocaine to Christ
 
 

American alternative metal musical groups
Alternative rock groups from Texas
BEC Recordings artists
Christian alternative metal groups
Christian rock groups from Texas
Heavy metal musical groups from Texas
Musical groups established in 1996